Bonchester cheese is a soft Scottish  cheese, made from unpasteurized Jersey cows' milk. It is produced at Bonchester Bridge, Roxburghshire.

During production, the cheese develops a white rind.

Its production in Europe is regulated under protected designation of origin laws.

See also 
 List of British Cheeses

References 
 

Scottish cheeses
Cow's-milk cheeses
British products with protected designation of origin
Cheeses with designation of origin protected in the European Union